The Oak Hill Historic District, also known as East Fort Dodge, is a nationally recognized historic district located in Fort Dodge, Iowa, United States.  It was listed on the National Register of Historic Places in 1977.  At the time of its nomination the district consisted of 22 resources, including 17 contributing buildings, and five noncontributing buildings.  The contributing buildings are all houses, including the Vincent House (1871), except for two buildings.  The exceptions are the Bennett Carriage House (1890) and the Blanden Art Gallery (1930).  The houses were built in various styles from 1866 to 1916.  Three apartment buildings, a funeral hone, and Grace Lutheran Church (1955) are the non-contributing buildings.

References

Fort Dodge, Iowa
Victorian architecture in Iowa
National Register of Historic Places in Webster County, Iowa
Historic districts in Webster County, Iowa
Historic districts on the National Register of Historic Places in Iowa